Oxford University Archaeological Society (OUAS), revived in 2020 as the Oxford Archaeological Society (OAS), is a society at the University of Oxford which promotes matters of archaeological interest through lectures, excursions and fieldwork. Its membership is not restricted to students, although it is generally run by undergraduate and graduate members of the University.

History and constitution
The OUAS was founded in 1919. Previously, archaeological interests had been represented at the university by the Brass Rubbing Society (1893–1901) and Antiquarian Society (1901-1914). Founding members of the OUAS included Edward Thurlow Leeds, later of the Ashmolean Museum, who held the position of honorary Vice-President until his death in 1955. Other notable archaeologists to have held the presidency of the society include Nowell Myres (1923), Martyn Jope, Kathleen Kenyon, Francis Maddison, Jeffrey May (1959) and Andrew Selkirk.

Vice-presidents (as of 2013) include Professors Sheppard Frere and Barry Cunliffe. The Society continues to be run by an annually-elected committee comprising a President or Co-Presidents, a Secretary, a Social Secretary and a Treasurer.

Activities
OUAS organizes weekly lectures during term-time, presented by archaeologists from outside Oxford as well as those based at the University. Non-members may attend but must pay an admission fee, although OUAS has an arrangement with the Oxfordshire Architectural and Historical Society whereby members of the two societies are entitled to attend each other's lectures.

Occasional excursions are also organized, allowing members to visit sites of archaeological interest.

OUAS has conducted various archaeological fieldwork projects in Oxfordshire, including excavations at Mingies Ditch and Alchester. Since 2007 the Society has been involved with excavation campaigns at Dorchester-on-Thames, a joint project of the University of Oxford, Oxford Archaeology and the people of the town.

References

External links
 OAS website

1919 establishments in England
Organizations established in 1919
Archaeology of the United Kingdom
Archaeological organizations
Clubs and societies of the University of Oxford